Compassion is a live album by bassist Cecil McBee's Sextet recorded at Sweet Basil in 1977 and released on the Enja label.

Reception

In his review for AllMusic,  Scott Yanow called it an "excellent post-bop set" and stated "The excellent solos, particularly those of Freeman, are adventurous, yet still based in the hard bop/modal tradition".

Track listing
All compositions by Cecil McBee except as indicated
 "Pepi´s Samba" (Chico Freeman) - 13:15
 "Undercurrent" - 10:55
 "Compassion" - 17:25

Personnel
Cecil McBee - bass
Joe Gardner - trumpet, flugelhorn
Chico Freeman - tenor saxophone, soprano saxophone
Dennis Moorman - piano
Steve McCall - drums 
Famoudou Don Moye -  congas

References

 
1979 live albums
Cecil McBee live albums
Enja Records live albums